Bryn Celynnog Comprehensive School is an 11–18 mixed, English-medium, community secondary school and sixth form in Beddau, Rhondda Cynon Taf, Wales.

Notable alumni 
 Ellis Jenkins, rugby union player
 Gethin Jenkins, rugby union player
 Neil Jenkins, rugby union player and coach
 Adrian Lewis Morgan, actor
 Kelly Morgan, badminton player
 Michael Owen, rugby union player
 David Roberts, swimmer

Notable staff 
 Paul John, former PE teacher

References

External links 
 

Pontypridd
Secondary schools in Rhondda Cynon Taf